The men's individual archery event was one of 4 archery events at the 2016 Summer Olympics. 

The medals were presented by Uğur Erdener, IOC member, Turkey and Tom Dielen, Secretary General of the World Archery Federation.

Competition format
As with the other archery events, the men's individual was a recurve archery event, held under the World Archery-approved 70-meter distance and rules. 64 archers participated. Competition began with a ranking round, in which each archer shot 72 arrows. The scores from the ranking round were used to seed the archers into a single-elimination bracket. The knockout matches used the set system introduced in 2012. Each match consisted of up to 5 sets of 3 arrows per archer. The archer with the best score in each set won the set, earning 2 points. If the score was tied, each archer received 1 point. The first archer to 6 points won the match. If the match was tied 5-5 after 5 sets, a single tie-breaker arrow was used with the closest to center winning.

Schedule 
All times are Brasília Time (UTC−3).

Records
Prior to the competition, the world and Olympic records were as follows. Kim Woo-jin broke both records.

72 arrow ranking round

Results

Ranking round

 WR:  World record
 OR:  Olympic record

Competition bracket

Section 1

Section 2

Section 3

Section 4

Finals

References

Archery at the 2016 Summer Olympics
Men's events at the 2016 Summer Olympics